Robert Mattson may refer to:

 Robert Mattson (businessman) (1851–1935), Finnish shipowner and businessman
 Robert W. Mattson Jr. (born 1948), American lawyer and politician in Minnesota
 Robert W. Mattson Sr. (1924–1982), American army veteran, lawyer, and politician in Minnesota

See also
Robert Matson (1796–1859), Kentucky plantation owner